Tarandale Dam is an earthfill dam on local river near Kankawali in the state of Maharashtra in India.

Specifications

See also
 Dams in Maharashtra
 List of reservoirs and dams in India

References

Dams in Maharashtra
Dams completed in 2007
2007 establishments in Maharashtra